Khavar-e Pain (also Romanized as Khāvar-e Pā’īn) is a village in Masabi Rural District, in the Central District of Sarayan County, South Khorasan Province, Iran. At the 2006 census, its population was 99, in 29 families.

References 

Populated places in Sarayan County